Bucket list may refer to:
 A list of activities to do before dying ("kick the bucket")
 Wish list
 The Bucket List, a 2007 comedy film
 Bucket List (2018 film), a 2018 Indian Marathi comedy-drama film
 "Bucket List" (song), a 2013 single by Nelly Furtado
 Bucket List (EP), a 2021 EP by Big Naughty
 "Bucket List", a 2020 song by Dean Brody from Boys 
 The Bucket List, series 2 of the television series An Idiot Abroad